The Premio Clarín de Novela is a prize for literature in the Spanish language awarded annually by Grupo Clarín. It was created in 1998 and its first awardee was Pedro Mairal. The winner receives 300,000 pesos ($) and the publication of his/her novel by the Clarín Alfaguara label. It is one of the most prestigious literary contests in Latin America. Writers from all over the world participate every year with unpublished works written in Spanish.

List of winners
 1998	Pedro Mairal, Una noche con Sabrina Love	
 1999	Leopoldo Brizuela, Inglaterra, una fábula	​
 2000	Pablo Toledo, Se esconde tras los ojos
 2001	Cristina Feijóo, Memorias del río inmóvil	
 2002	María Henestrosa, Las ingratas	
 2003	Patricia Suárez, Perdida en el momento	
 2004	Ángela Pradelli, El lugar del padre	
 2005	Claudia Piñeiro, Las viudas de los jueves	
 2006	Betina González, Arte Menor	
 2007	Norma Huidobro, El lugar perdido	
 2008	Raquel Robles, Perder	
 2009	Federico Jeanmaire, Más liviano que el aire	​
 2010	Gustavo Nielsen, La otra playa	
 2011	Luis Lozano, El imitador de Dios	
 2012	Fernando Monacelli, Sobrevivientes	
 2013	Fabián Martínez Siccardi, Bestias afuera	
 2014	Daniel Ferreira, Rebelión de los oficios inútiles	
 2015	Manuel Soriano, ¿Qué se sabe de Patricia Lukastic?	
 2016	Carlos Bernatek, El canario	
 2017	Agustina María Bazterrica, Cadáver exquisito	
 2018	José Niemetz, Tú eres para mí	
 2019	Marcelo Caruso, Negro el dolor del mundo	
 2020	Ignacio Arabehety, Asomados a un pozo	
 2021	Agustina Caride, Donde retumba el silencio
 2022  Miguel Gaya, El desierto invisible

References

Argentine literary awards